Vengal Rao Gottimukula (born 27 November 1960) is an Indian politician belonging to the Indian National Congress.

Political career
Vengal Rao Gottimukula was elected from the Kukatpally Division in 2010, and he is the member of Standing committee. Rao had a good relationship with Late Sri.PJR. He gained respect of the people in his division by involving in development/welfare activities.

References
http://janaspandana.com/listing/fv_govt/contactus.php?dp=1&id=61577

External links
 http://janaspandana.com/listing/fv_govt/contactus.php?dp=1&id=61577

Indian National Congress politicians
Politicians from Hyderabad, India
1960 births
Living people